The Stupids are an English hardcore punk band formed in the 1980s by Tom Withers.

Career

Formed in Ipswich, England in the mid 1980s, The Stupids released four albums and six EPs, and recorded three sessions for John Peel's BBC Radio 1 show in the 1980s, and toured the United States (with Ludichrist) and Australia (the Hard-Ons) as well as Europe, the United Kingdom, and, most recently, Japan. 

The band have featured on various CD re-issues, compilation albums (e.g. Sounds and the U.S. skate magazine, Thrasher), collector singles, and BBC session releases released by Strange Fruit.

The Stupids were featured in the 22 August 1987 edition of the NME about the band and the UK skate scene, and also made the front page.

A live video tape, Drive-In Hit Movie, was released shortly after the band broke up in 1989.

Post-break up
After the band split, Tommy Stupid went on to forge a new career in drum and bass as Klute. Of the other members, Wolfie Retard continued with Perfect Daze and Lovejunk, while Ed Shred continued with Sink (later Big Ray); both also played together in the band Chocolate. After a hiatus from live music, Ed went on to form K-Line, and later Dealing With Damage.

Reunion
Tommy Stupid reformed the Stupids in 2008, with a new line-up. In June 2008, Boss Tuneage released a comprehensive reissues series of the Stupids, co-ordinating six CD and LP reissues of their entire back catalogue; four for release on the Boss Tuneage Retro Series imprint, the other two on Visible Noise.

In 2009, The Stupids released their first studio album in 20 years, The Kids Don't Like it, on Boss Tuneage.

2011 saw the release of Japanese Vacation on Waterslide Records, Boss Tuneage's sister label, to coincide with a tour of Japan. The band had to cancel their 2012 European tour because Tommy Stupid broke his leg.

Members
 Tommy Stupid - drums/vocals/guitars
 Wolfie Retard - bass/vocals
 Marty Tuff - guitar
 Ed Shred - guitar/vocals/bass
 Gizz Butt - guitar
 Steve Snax - bass
 Pauly Pizza - bass
 Rossi O'Schmitt - bass (2008–2012)
 Wild Johnny Stallion (John Roscoe) - bass (2013-present)

with guest spots from:
 Stuey Q - bass
 Mitch - guitar
 Bobby Justice - vocals
 Dave Ross - vocals
 Chris Shary - vocals
 Ziggy - drums

Discography

Albums
 Peruvian Vacation (Children of The Revolution Records - 1985)
 Retard Picnic (Children of The Revolution Records - 1986)
 Van Stupid (Vinyl Solution - 1987)
 Jesus Meets The Stupids (Vinyl Solution - 1988)
 The Kids Don't Like It album (Boss Tuneage - 2009)

EPs and singles
 Violent Nun 7" EP (Children of The Revolution Records - 1985)
 Eat 12" EP (As Frankfurter) (Vinyl Solution - 1987)
 Mail Order Only 7" EP (Vinyl Solution - 1987)
 The Peel Sessions 7"/12" EP (Strange Fruit - 1988)
 No Cheese! (The High-Way To Hell Tour Souvenir) 10" EP (Split Tour EP With The Hard-Ons) (Vinyl Solution/Waterfront Records - 1989)
 Wipe Out 7" EP (A PBJ Production - 1989)
 "Feel The Suck" 7" (Boss Tuneage - 2008)
 Japanese Vacation EP (Waterslide Records/Boss Tuneage - 2011)
 Demonstration Tape '89 7" EP (Alona's Dream - 2013)

References

External links
Official Stupids website
Boss Tuneage website
Peel Sessions - The Stupids
The Stupids - ReverbNation

English punk rock groups